A by-election was held for the Dewan Rakyat parliamentary seat of Bukit Gelugor on 25 May 2014 following the nomination day on 12 May 2014. The seat fell vacant after the passing of the incumbent MP, Karpal Singh in a motor accident near Kampar, Perak on 17 April 2014. Karpal hailed from the Democratic Action Party, a component party of Pakatan Rakyat. A political and legal veteran, he served in the Parliament since 1978 (except for a brief period) and as the chairman of the DAP from 2004 until 2014. He won by a majority of 41,778 votes against Barisan Nasional (Malaysian Chinese Association) candidate Teh Beng Yeam in the 2013 general election.

The DAP fielded Ramkarpal Singh, Karpal's son and a lawyer. Hours after Ramkarpal's candidacy was announced, MCA decided to defer from contesting the by-election thus leaving BN with no candidate in the by-election. BN chief and Prime Minister Najib Razak indicated that BN would instead throw support on other candidates. Parti Cinta Malaysia vice-president and former BN MP for Batu Kawan Huan Cheng Guan contested in the by-election along with two independents Mohamed Nabi Bux Mohamed Abdul Sathar and Abu Backer Sidek Mohammad Zan. Abu Backer withdrew a day before the by-election, although his decision was not recognized by the Electoral Commission. The number of eligible voters in this constituency was 82,431.

Results 
Ramkarpal Singh won the by-election with a majority of 37,659 votes compared to his nearest challenger. The other three candidates lost their deposit after failing to receive at least one-eighth of the votes. The turnout in the by-election is 30% lower compared to the turnout in the 2013 general election.

References 

2014 elections in Malaysia
2014 Bukit Gelugor by-election
Elections in Penang